Murfreesboro is a town in Hertford County, North Carolina, United States. The population was 2,835 at the 2010 census. The town is home to Chowan University.

Geography
Murfreesboro is located in northwestern Hertford County at  (36.440983, -77.096901), on high ground south of the Meherrin River. U.S. Route 258 runs through the eastern end of the town, and U.S. Route 158 bypasses the town to the south. US-258 leads southwest  to Tarboro and northeast  to Franklin, Virginia, while US-158 leads east  to Winton, the Hertford county seat, and west  to Roanoke Rapids.

Climate

Demographics

2020 census

As of the 2020 United States census, there were 2,619 people, 1,081 households, and 552 families residing in the town.

History

Before European settlement
The first recorded inhabitants of the area were Native Americans from the Nottoway, Meherrin and Chowanoke tribes.

The first European known to visit the area was John White of the Roanoke Colony in the 16th century. It was also visited by an expedition from Jamestown, Virginia, in the 17th century.

The last native inhabitants, the Chowanoke, were expelled after warring with the English in 1675 and 1676. After that, they were moved to a reservation east of the Chowan River in what is now Gates County.

Colonial era to the American Revolution
The first known deed to property in the area is a land grant dated November 5, 1714, made to Henry Wheeler for a tract on the Meherrin River which included what is now Murfreesboro. Several other transactions quickly followed, and in 1735 Joseph Parker founded the Meherrin Church. It is the second-oldest Baptist church in North Carolina (now known as Meherrin Baptist Church).

On May 27, 1746, James Jordon Scott sold  on the Meherrin River (part of Wheeler's original grant) to an Irish immigrant, William Murfree from Nansemond County, Virginia. On December 12, 1754, the General Assembly designated Murfree's Landing as a King's Landing, where imports and exports would be inspected by a representative of the King.

Revolution to the American Civil War

On July 17, 1781, British forces led by Banastre Tarleton and Tarleton's Raiders attacked Maney's Neck near Murfree's Landing. William Murfree's son, Hardy Murfree, led a local militia that repulsed the attack at Skinner's Bridge.

William Murfree contributed  of land surrounding Murfree's Landing in 1787 to the growing settlement to form a town. The town was chartered by the General Assembly and renamed Murfreesboro on January 6, 1787. This act also provided for the establishment of a public dock, as the town was located at the northernmost point of navigation on the Meherrin River.

Murfreesboro was designated by the US Congress in 1790 as an official port of entry, and the customs records indicate a profitable three-cornered trade with New England and the West Indies.

In 1809, the Hertford Academy was established in Murfreesboro, opening in 1811 for male students. In 1814, Harriet Sketchly and Martha Sketchly arrived and expanded the female department of the academy considerably. By 1849, it was renamed as the Chowan Baptist Female Institute, the forerunner of Chowan University.

In 1831 Murfreesboro was among towns that sent armed forces (these were led by Captain Solon Borland) to Southampton County, Virginia, to quell Nat Turner's slave rebellion. As a result of these events, Virginia and North Carolina reduced the rights of free blacks, prohibiting education of both free blacks and slaves.

Education
Local children may attend Riverview Elementary School and Hertford County Middle School, both of which are part of the Hertford County Public Schools system.

Chowan University, a small Baptist university, is located in Murfreesboro.

Commerce
Murfreesboro is no longer an active port. The last commercial vessel to operate on a regular basis was a Texaco Oil barge; it ceased service to the town in October 1966.

The town is served by the Roanoke-Chowan News-Herald newspaper, which is based in nearby Ahoskie.

Attractions
Numerous buildings of the town, mostly grand houses, are on the National Register of Historic Places: the David A. Barnes House, The Cedars, The Columns, Cowper-Thompson House, Freeman House, Melrose, Myrick House, Myrick-Yeates-Vaughan House, Francis Parker House, William Rea Store, Roberts-Vaughan House, and John Wheeler House. In addition, Princeton Site and the Murfreesboro Historic District are listed on the NRHP.

The John Wheeler House is identified as the birthplace of John Hill Wheeler, a planter and politician who served as Minister to Nicaragua and North Carolina State Treasurer. In 2013 it was established that Hannah Bond, a slave who escaped to the North and wrote The Bondwoman's Narrative under the name of Hannah Crafts, had been held by him as a domestic servant. She escaped about 1857 from his plantation and wrote her manuscript on paper traced to his library. It was found in the early 21st century, authenticated and published for the first time in 2002 as the first known novel by an African-American woman.

The old Murfreesboro public school (which housed grades 1 - 12 until 1972) has been redeveloped as the Brady C. Jefcoat Museum. It houses the collections of Brady Jefcoat, a Raleigh native. It includes hundreds of well-preserved ordinary items from the late 19th and early 20th century, including functional phonographs, radios, washing machines, and agricultural implements, as well as a wide variety of other novelties.

Notable residents
 William Hill Brown, author of the first American novel.
Tim Cofield, former NFL and CFL linebacker
Sallie Southall Cotten, writer and clubwoman
Curtis Deloatch, former cornerback in the NFL
Khalid Sheikh Mohammed, an Al Qaeda leader, attended Chowan University in 1983
Hardy Murfree, lieutenant colonel from North Carolina during the American Revolutionary War
Julian Myrick, insurance salesman and promoter of tennis
William N. H. Smith, Democratic congressman and North Carolina Supreme Court justice
Dwight Stephenson, center in the NFL, 5x First Team All-Pro selection and member of the Pro Football Hall of Fame
Fred Vinson, former NBA player and current coach
John H. Wheeler, first United States ambassador to Nicaragua and head of the United States Mint

See also
Roanoke-Chowan Pork-Fest
North Carolina Watermelon Festival
Chowan University

External links
Town of Murfreesboro official website
Murfreesboro Historic Association

References

 
Populated places established in 1787
Towns in Hertford County, North Carolina
Towns in North Carolina